Combpyne is a hamlet in East Devon, England, off the A3052 road between Colyford and Lyme Regis in Dorset.

Combpyne is situated within a remote Devon combe, and features a medieval manor house, a 12th-century church housing wall paintings and ancient bells and a village pond known as 'The Harbour'.  It is in a parish that also includes the village of Rousdon to the south.

The former railway station at Combpyne was a part of the Lyme Regis branch line and closed in 1965, along with many other small branch lines across the county. Traces of the dismantled railway, including the large Cannington Viaduct, can be seen nearby. The former stationmaster's house is now a private residence.

References

External links

Villages in Devon